Nothing Human Left is a 2011 novel by the Irish writer Simon Ashe-Browne.  It won the Dundee International Book Prize, the largest monetary British Prize for first novels, in 2011, and was published by Cargo Publishing.  It is a psychological thriller based primarily in a Dublin public school.

See also
 2011 in literature
 Scottish literature

References

2011 Irish novels
English-language novels
Novels set in schools
Novels set in Dublin (city)
2011 debut novels